Julianne Baird (born Statesville, N.C. December 10, 1952) is an American soprano best known for her singing in Baroque works, in both opera and sacred music. She has more than 100 recordings to her credit and is a well-traveled recitalist and soloist with major symphony orchestras. She is also a noted teacher of voice.

Biography
Baird grew up in Kent, Ohio, graduating from Kent's Theodore Roosevelt High School in 1970.

She studied voice and Musicology at the Eastman School of Music, earned a Diploma in Performance Practice from the Salzburg Mozarteum,  and earned a Doctor of Philosophy degree in Musicology from Stanford University.

Baird is a Distinguished professor at Rutgers University where she directs a Madrigal Ensemble and teaches Music History, specifically Ancient Music, Renaissance Music and Baroque Music. She frequently teaches master classes and workshops throughout the United States. She published an annotated translation of the 18th-century treatise, Introduction to the Art of Singing by Johann Friedrich Agricola (Cambridge University Press, 1995).

As a performer, she is best known for her extensive discography and for performances of music by Johann Sebastian Bach (especially the B-minor Mass, the Magnificat, and a number of cantatas) and George Frideric Handel (especially Messiah). She has made premiere recordings of a number of  Handel operas (including Deidamia, Siroe, Muzio Scevola, Sosarme,  and Berenice).  She has also sung works by Henry Purcell, John Dowland, Claudio Monteverdi, and Georg Philipp Telemann.  Modern American composers whose music she has recorded include Lukas Foss and Steve Reich.

Recordings

Complete Operas

J.S. Bach Cantatas, Passions and Masses-Complete Works 

Oratorios

Recitals 

Music for Christmas (Recordings)

References

Sources
Cummings, David (ed.), "Baird, Julianne", International Who's Who in Classical Music, Routledge, 2003, p. 38. 
Gehman, Geoff, "Spotlight on Julianne Baird Soprano Can Fit Classical Music into Social Setting", Morning Call, 16 January 1999, p. A7.
Stearns, David Patrick, "A Career Full of Incident - Julianne Baird, Baroque Soprano Extraordinaire", Philadelphia Inquirer, 19 October 2005

External links
 Home Page 
 Department of Fine Arts, Camden College, Rutgers
 Amherst Early Music

1952 births
Living people
American operatic sopranos
People from Kent, Ohio
People from Statesville, North Carolina
Albany Records artists
Singers from Ohio
Classical musicians from Ohio
21st-century American women